is a Japanese kickboxer, currently competing in the super featherweight division of RISE. As of October 2022, he is ranked as the third best super bantamweight by Beyond Kick and the fourth best bantamweight by Combat Press.

Kickboxing career

RISE

Early career
Hitachi made his professional debut against the future RISE featherweight (-57.5 kg) champion Keisuke Monguchi on the prelims of RISE 128 on November 2, 2018. He lost the fight by a first-round technical knockout. Hitachi next faced Masaaki Ono at RISE EVOL.2 on February 8, 2019. He won the fight by unanimous decision, with two judges scoring the bout 29–28 in his favor, while the third judge awarded Hitachi all three rounds of the bout. Hitachi failed to build on this victory however, as he suffered a unanimous decision loss to Ryosuke Nakazawa at RISE EVOL.3 on April 26, 2019, with all three judges scoring the fight 29–28 for Nakazawa.

Hitachi faced Masaumi Shimizu at RISE WEST ZERO on July 28, 2019. He won the fight by a third-round knockout, the first stoppage victory of his professional career. Hitachi faced REITO BRAVELY at Rise West 12 on December 8, 2019, in his fourth and final fight of the year. The bout was ruled a split decision draw. Two of the judges awarded a 30–29 scorecard to Hitachi and REITO respectively, while the third judge scored the fight as an even 29–29 draw.

Rise up the ranks
After amassing a 2–2–1 record in his first five fights, Hitachi was booked to face Masanori Shimada at the fifth iteration of the RISE EVOL series, which was held on February 10, 2020. He won the fight by a second-round knockout, flooring Shimada with a right hook at the 1:54 minute mark of the round.

Hitachi faced Shun Onishi at Rise 149 on May 23, 2021, following a 15-month absence from competition. It was his first appearance on a numbered RISE event since his debut in November 2018. Hitachi won the fight by a second-round knockout. He dropped Onishi with a right straight near the end of the round, which left him unable to rise from the canvas in time to beat the eight-count.

These two victories earned Hitachi the #7 ranking in the RISE super featherweight division, as well as a fight with the #5 ranked contender SEIDO. The bout was booked for the undercard of Rise 152, which took place on October 22, 2021. He won the fight by unanimous decision, with scores of 30–29, 30–28 and 30–28.

Hitachi took a slight step-down in competition in his next bout, as he was scheduled to fight the top-ranked DEEP KICK super featherweight contender Taisei Iwago at Rise 154 on January 23, 2022. He won the fight by a second-round knockout, stopping Iwago with a right hook with just three seconds left in the round.

Hitachi faced the top ranked RISE super featherweight contender Yusaku Ishizuki at Rise El Dorado 2022 on April 2, 2022. He won the fight by a first-round knockout. He first forced the referee to step in, and call a knockdown, with a flurry of punches just past the midway point of the opening round. The referee waved the fight off soon after, as Ishizuki appeared unresponsive to Hitachi's hooking punches.

As he was unable to get a fight with the reigning RISE super featherweight champion Chan Hyung Lee, who was obliged to fight the interim titlist Kazuma, Hitachi faced the two-weight Shootboxing champion Yuki Kasahara at SHOOT BOXING 2022 act.4 on September 14, 2022. He won the fight by a second-round knockout.

Lee challenged Chan Hyung Lee for the RISE Super Featherweight Championship at RISE 160 on January 28, 2023. The fight was ruled a majority decision draw after the first five rounds, with one judge scoring the bout 49–48 for Lee, while the remaining two judges scored it an even 48–48. Lee was awarded the unanimous decision after an extra sixth round was contested.

Championships and accomplishments

Amateur
 2016 All Japan University Kickboxing Featherweight (-57.5 kg) Championship and Best Newcomer Award
 2017 All Japan University Kickboxing Featherweight (-57.5 kg) Championship and Best Fighter Award

Fight record

|-  style="background:#fbb;"
| 2023-01-28 || Loss ||align=left| Chan Hyung Lee|| RISE 164 || Tokyo, Japan || Ext.R Decision (Unanimous) || 6 ||3:00 
|-
! style=background:white colspan=9 |
|-  style="background:#cfc"
| 2022-09-17 || Win ||align=left| Yuki Kasahara || Shoot Boxing 2022 act.4 || Tokyo, Japan || KO (Right straight) || 2 || 1:12
|-
|-  style="background:#cfc"
| 2022-04-02 || Win ||align=left| Yusaku Ishizuki || Rise El Dorado 2022 || Tokyo, Japan || TKO (Three knockdowns) || 1 || 2:59
|-
|-  style="background:#cfc"
| 2022-01-23 || Win ||align=left| Taisei Iwago || Rise 154 || Tokyo, Japan || KO (Right hook) || 2 || 2:57
|-
|-  style="background:#cfc"
| 2021-10-22 || Win ||align=left| SEIDO || Rise 152 || Tokyo, Japan || Decision (Unanimous) || 3 || 3:00
|-
|-  style="background:#cfc"
| 2021-07-04 || Win ||align=left| Rai || DEEP☆KICK 54 || Osaka, Japan || TKO (Referee stoppage) || 2 || 2:37
|-
|-  style="background:#cfc"
| 2021-05-23 || Win ||align=left| Shun Onishi || Rise 149 || Tokyo, Japan || KO (Right straight) || 2 || 2:38
|-
|-  style="background:#cfc"
| 2020-02-10 || Win ||align=left| Masanori Shimada || RISE EVOL.5 || Tokyo, Japan || KO (Right hook) || 2 || 1:54
|-
|-  style="background:#c5d2ea"
| 2019-12-08|| Draw ||align=left| REITO BRAVELY || Rise West 12 || Fukuoka, Japan || Decision (Split) || 3 || 3:00
|-
|-  style="background:#cfc"
| 2019-07-28 || Win ||align=left| Masaumi Shimizu || RISE WEST ZERO || Tokyo, Japan || KO || 3 || 2:40
|-
|-  style="background:#fbb"
| 2019-04-26 || Loss ||align=left| Ryosuke Nakazawa || RISE EVOL.3 || Tokyo, Japan || Decision (Unanimous) || 3 || 3:00
|-
|-  style="background:#cfc"
| 2019-02-08 || Win ||align=left| Masaaki Ono || RISE EVOL.2 || Tokyo, Japan || Decision (Unanimous) || 3 || 3:00
|-
|-  style="background:#fbb"
| 2018-11-02 || Loss ||align=left| Keisuke Monguchi || RISE 128 || Tokyo, Japan || TKO (Punches) || 1 || 1:53
|-
| colspan=9 | Legend:    

|-  style="background:#fbb"
| 2018-07-21 || Loss ||align=left| Pakorn Yoppakaw || World College Muaythai Championship || Pattaya, Thailand || KO || 2 || 
|-
|-  style="background:#cfc"
| 2017-11-25 || Win ||align=left| Ryo Hirayama || 2017 All Japan Student Kickboxing Championship, -57.5kg Tournament Final || Tokyo, Japan || KO || 3 || 2:00
|-
! style=background:white colspan=9 |
|-
|-  style="background:#cfc"
| 2016-11-26 || Win ||align=left| Taiki Morita || 2016 All Japan Student Kickboxing Championship, -57.5kg Tournament Final || Tokyo, Japan || Decision (Majority) || 3 || 2:00
|-
! style=background:white colspan=9 |
|-
|-  style="background:#c5d2ea"
| 2016-09-18 || Draw ||align=left| Ryo Miyake || 2016 All Japan Student Kickboxing Championship, -57.5kg Tournament Preliminaries || Tokyo, Japan || Decision (Majority) || 3 || 2:00
|-
! style=background:white colspan=9 |
|-
|-  style="background:#fbb"
| 2015-08-15 || Loss ||align=left| Yuto Shinohara || 2015 K-1 Koshien, -65kg Tournament Quarterfinals || Tokyo, Japan || KO ||  || 
|-
|-  style="background:#cfc"
| 2015-08-15 || Win ||align=left| Takuma Tsukamoto || 2015 K-1 Koshien, -65kg Tournament Second Round || Tokyo, Japan || Ext. R. Decision (Split) || 2 || 2:00
|-
| colspan=9 | Legend:

See also
 List of male kickboxers

References

Living people
1998 births
Japanese male kickboxers
Sportspeople from Fukuoka Prefecture
People from Munakata, Fukuoka